A. Upparahalli  is a village in the southern state of Karnataka, India. It is located in the Malur taluk of Kolar district in Karnataka.

See also
 Kolar
 Districts of Karnataka

References

External links
  A. Upparahalli listed on Government of India website.

Villages in Kolar district